Jim Marsh (born September 7, 1951 in Quesnel, British Columbia) is a retired World Hockey Association player for the Birmingham Bulls. He played in only one game.

See also
History of ice hockey

References

External links
 

Canadian ice hockey defencemen
Birmingham Bulls players
Ice hockey people from British Columbia
People from the Cariboo Regional District
Living people
1951 births